The Icicle Works (also known as Icicle Works in the United States) are an English alternative rock band and were named after the 1960 short story "The Day the Icicle Works Closed" by science fiction author Frederik Pohl. They had a top 20 UK hit with "Love Is a Wonderful Colour" (1983).  In the US and Canada, they had only one top 40 hit, the 1984 single "Birds Fly (Whisper to a Scream)".

Led by singer-songwriter Ian McNabb, the band released five albums from 1984 to 1990 before breaking up in 1991. McNabb later convened a revised line-up of the band in 2006 to play live shows; this revised Icicle Works line-up still plays sporadic live dates.

History

1980–1983: Formation and early years
The band was founded in Liverpool in 1980 when bassist Chris Layhe (who had been in a couple of local rock bands including Elanor and Blind Owl) answered an advertisement for a musical collaborator placed by 20-year-old Ian McNabb. The two got together and started writing. They quickly added drummer Chris Sharrock (who had previously drummed for the Cherry Boys), and began playing live shows as "The Icicle Works".

In 1981, the band recorded a six-song independently released cassette entitled Ascending. In 1982, they released the independent single "Nirvana", which made it to No. 15 on the UK Indie Chart. The following year, the Icicle Works were signed to the Beggars Banquet label, who issued the single "Birds Fly (Whisper to a Scream)" on their subsidiary label Situation Two.

Later that year, The Icicle Works released their biggest UK hit, 1983's "Love Is a Wonderful Colour", which was a Top 15 single. Their 1984 eponymous debut album followed shortly thereafter, reached number 24 on the UK Albums Chart and entered the US top 40. Appearing on the US top 40 singles chart at around the same time (and hitting the Canadian top twenty) was "Whisper to a Scream (Birds Fly)", a retitled and slightly remixed version of the band's Situation Two release of 1983.

1984–1988: Touring years

After the release of their self-titled debut album the Icicle Works struggled to match their initial commercial success. They continued to receive critical acclaim as a live band and secured a loyal fan base both in the UK and abroad.

In September 1984, the band issued the UK-only single "Hollow Horse", which flopped (though it later became a live favourite in the band's sets). A series of follow-up singles similarly missed the charts, including the Motown-flavoured "All The Daughters" and the folk-rock inspired "Seven Horses". Added to the live line-up around this time was keyboardist Chris "Tugsie" Turrill; Turrill was not an official member of the band, and did not play on any of their recordings. Prior to Turrill's arrival, both McNabb and Layhe had previously doubled up on instruments playing guitar, keyboard and percussion at live gigs. Layhe was often seen playing the octobans and McNabb occasionally played an open tuned guitar with his right hand and a keyboard with his left.

The band's second LP, The Small Price of a Bicycle came out in mid-1985. The album was a UK-only release—their US label, Arista Records, dismissed the album as 'punk-rock demos' and declined to release it.  
  
Beginning in 1986, though the band was still officially a trio, keyboardist Dave Green became an auxiliary member of The Icicle Works, replacing Turrill. Green both played at live shows and contributed to the band's recordings.

In early 1986, Beggars' Banquet compiled all the 12" mixes of the band's singles onto a UK-only LP entitled Seven Singles Deep, which hit No. 52 on the UK Albums Chart.

In July 1986, The Icicle Works had a UK chart hit with the almost punk-sounding "Understanding Jane", which peaked at No. 52. The song was later covered by The Wildhearts on their 2008 covers album Stop Us If You've Heard It Before, vol. 1.

The pop-oriented follow-up single "Who Do You Want For Your Love" peaked at No. 54, and January 1987's "Evangeline" peaked at No. 53.  All three songs found their way on to the 1987 album If You Want to Defeat Your Enemy Sing His Song, produced by Ian Broudie. The album was released in both Britain and North America and hit No. 28 on the UK Albums Chart.

Later in 1987, The Icicle Works issued the single "High Time". It peaked at No. 76 in the UK, but in 1988 it hit No. 13 on the newly created US Modern Rock chart.

The band's fourth studio album, Blind, was produced by McNabb and issued in 1988, and reached the Top 40 of the album chart. The album featured 13 tracks in the UK and Canada, but the US version of the album featured a different track listing, slightly edited versions of a few songs, and a different cover. Still, both versions of the album contained "High Time" and the minor British hit "Little Girl Lost", which peaked at No. 59.

1989–1991: New line-up and split
By the late 1980s, tensions within the group were increasing, allegedly due to McNabb's controlling ways. By 1988, in addition to writing virtually all of The Icicle Works' material (as well as singing and playing guitar) McNabb was producing the group's records.

Accordingly, shortly after Blind was issued, drummer Chris Sharrock departed to The La's. Sharrock would later join The Lightning Seeds and World Party, and would drum for Robbie Williams, Del Amitri, Eurythmics, Oasis and Beady Eye. As of 2018 he is the drummer for Noel Gallagher's High Flying Birds. Layhe also departed at this time. Beggars Banquet subsequently dropped the group from their roster.

McNabb continued to perform under the name The Icicle Works for a while. Dave Green was promoted to official membership status, although he left the band within a year. Zak Starkey was added on drums for a time, and various keyboardists, bassists, and guitarists passed through before the band released their final album Permanent Damage (1990), recorded for Epic/Sony. By that time, the band's line-up was McNabb, bassist Roy Corkill, former 10cc and Jethro Tull drummer Paul Burgess, keyboardist Dave Baldwin, and backing vocalist Mark Revell. This 'second-generation' version of The Icicle Works broke up after Permanent Damage failed to chart, and Epic dropped the band. McNabb's solo career officially began in 1991 with the release of the single "Great Dreams of Heaven".

In 1992, a compilation called The Best of The Icicle Works was released, containing the best of their work from the Beggars Banquet years. Two years later, a live recording of a 1987 concert was issued.

2006–present: Revival and studio album reissues

After having been a solo act for 15 years, in 2006 McNabb unexpectedly reactivated The Icicle Works name for a series of six UK concerts in October of that year. This version of the band consisted of McNabb, former 'second-generation' Icicle Works bassist Roy Corkill, and two new members: keyboard player Richard Naiff and ex-Dodgy drummer Mathew Priest, both of McNabb's long-time solo touring band. Original drummer Chris Sharrock had been invited to play with the revived group, but declined to participate. That same year, the Icicle Works' self-titled debut album was reissued as both a 2-CD and limited edition 3-CD set, each featuring a wealth of bonus tracks and radio sessions.

The Icicle Works later appeared at GuilFest 2007 and played a nine-date UK tour in December 2007. McNabb and company played two free shows as 'The Icicle Works' in Liverpool in January 2008.

Later in 2008, a compilation of unreleased early Icicle Works tracks and demos called Lost Icicles, Volume 1 was issued as a digital-only release. Lost Icicles, Volume 2, a recording of a live show from 1984, was issued as a digital-only release around the same time.

McNabb continued to play gigs as a solo artist throughout 2009 and 2010. In 2009, the band's fifth album Permanent Damage was reissued in a 2-CD set with bonus tracks. Over the next two years, the band's three remaining studio albums were reissued in deluxe 2-CD and 3-CD sets, all featuring numerous bonus tracks.

After a three-year hiatus from performing, the McNabb/Corkhill/Naiff/Priest line-up played a series of 30th Anniversary gigs as The Icicle Works in 2011. In an unrelated event, on 11 August of that year, original Icicle Works member Chris Layhe joined Ian McNabb onstage at a McNabb solo gig. The duo performed 3 Icicle Works songs and one cover song by The Clash. It was the first time McNabb and Layhe had performed together in 23 years.

While McNabb continues to perform, record and release new material as a solo artist, The Icicle Works typically continue to play a handful of UK shows every year or two.

Band members
Current
 Ian McNabb – guitar, lead vocals, keyboards (1980–1990, 2006–present)
 Roy Corkill – bass (1988–1990, 2006–present)
 Richard Naiff – keyboards (2006–present)
 Mathew Priest – drums (2006–present)

Former
 Chris Layhe – bass, backing vocals (1980–1988)
 Chris Sharrock – drums (1981–1988)
 Zak Starkey – drums (1988)
 Dave Green – keyboards (1986-1988)
 Dave Baldwin – keyboards (1989–1990)
 Ged Lynch – drums (1989)
 Mark Revell – backing vocals (1990)
 Paul Burgess – drums (1990)

Discography

The Icicle Works (1984)
The Small Price of a Bicycle (1985)
If You Want to Defeat Your Enemy Sing His Song (1987)
Blind (1988)
Permanent Damage (1990)

Sources
 Whitburn, Joel (1987).  The Billboard Book of Top 40 Albums. New York:  Billboard Publications, Inc. 
 Whitburn, Joel (1987).  The Billboard Book of Top 40 Hits (3rd ed.). New York:  Billboard Publications, Inc.  
 Official Discography at the Ian McNabb web page
 Barwood, Tony.  Liner notes to "The Icicle Works" (2006 reissue).

References

External links
Ian McNabb and The Icicle Works Detailed Discography
Video interview with Ian McNabb and Ian McNabb acoustic session from BBC Liverpool08

English alternative rock groups
English new wave musical groups
English post-punk music groups
Musical groups established in 1980
Musical groups disestablished in 1991
Musical groups reestablished in 2006
Musical groups from Liverpool
Arista Records artists
Beggars Banquet Records artists
Epic Records artists
Situation Two artists